Tommy Cumming (born 19 June 1956 in Scotland) is an Australian former association football player and coach.

Playing career

Club career
Cumming played for Sunshine City and Essendon Croatia in the Victorian State League before playing for Melbourne Croatia in the National Soccer League.

International career
Cumming played four times for Australia in 1980, scoring one goal.

Coaching career
In 1984 and 1985 Cumming, while still playing, coached Melbourne Croatia in the National Soccer League.

References

1956 births
Living people
Scottish emigrants to Australia
Australian soccer players
Australia international soccer players
National Soccer League (Australia) players
Expatriate soccer players in Australia
Green Gully SC players
Melbourne Knights FC players
Association football forwards